Megan Jane Davis is an Aboriginal Australian activist and international human rights lawyer. She was the first Indigenous Australian to sit on a United Nations body, and was Chair of the UN Permanent Forum on Indigenous Issues. Davis is Pro vice-Chancellor, Indigenous, and Balnaves Chair in Constitutional Law at the University of New South Wales. She is especially known for her work on the Uluru Statement from the Heart.

Early life and education
Megan Jane Davis was born in Monto. Her family moved along the Queensland Railway. Her ancestry is Aboriginal Australian (Cobble Cobble, from south-east Queensland) and South Pacific Islander.

She was brought up by a single parent, and one of her earliest interests was the United Nations General Assembly. She attended the University of Queensland, earning a law degree. In this period she met and was mentored by Jackie Huggins, who convinced her to work for Aboriginal and Islander Research Action (FAIRA) in Brisbane, which led her to apply to the United Nations Fellowship.

Career
Davis was an international lawyer at the United Nations, where in the period from 1999 until 2004 she helped work on the Declaration on the Rights of Indigenous Peoples, including providing legal advice to ATSIC Commissioners during the drafting stages. 

In 2010, she became the first Indigenous Australian woman to be elected to a United Nations body when she was appointed to the United Nations Permanent Forum on Indigenous Issues which is based in New York. holding that position from 2011 to 2016. She has been a member of the UN Expert Mechanism on the Rights of Indigenous Peoples (EMRIP) since 2017, and in July 2021 she was appointed its chair.

Davis was on the Australian Government's expert panel on the country's Indigenous people in 2011, and was a member of the Prime Minister's Referendum Council from 2015-2017.  

As a member of the Referendum Council, Davis was instrumental in assisting the development of the Uluru Statement From the Heart, designing the deliberative dialogues and chairing the Council's sub-committee for the First Nations regional Dialogues and the First Nations Constitutional Convention in 2017.

Davis was the Director of the Indigenous Law Centre (part of the UNSW law faculty) from 2006-2016. She was subsequently appointed the univertist's Pro Vice-Chancellor in 2017, Indigenous and the Indigenous Law Centre's Balnaves Chair in Constitutional Law in 2020.

Other roles
In 2017, Davis was appointed a Commissioner on the Australian Rugby League Commission. In 2020 she was reappointed for another term. Davis has described growing up in a  "crazy rugby league family", and wanting to "give back to a game that gave so much to me and my family".

Awards and honours
 In October 2018 Professor Davis was named overall winner of The Australian Financial Review 100 Women of Influence award.

 Davis was elected Fellow of the Academy of the Social Sciences in Australia in 2017 and is a Fellow of the Australian Academy of Law.

 Davis accepted the Sydney Peace Prize in 2021, alongside Pat Anderson and Noel Pearson, on behalf of the Uluru Statement From the Heart.

 Davis is listed on the Te Hononga Pūkenga ("the connection of experts") database of Ngā Pae o te Māramatanga, New Zealand's Māori Centre of Research Excellence.

References

1975 births
Living people
People from Queensland
Academic staff of the University of New South Wales
Australian officials of the United Nations
Australian women lawyers
Fellows of the Academy of the Social Sciences in Australia
Australian indigenous rights activists
21st-century Australian lawyers